Manoranjan Bhattacharya may refer to:

 Manoranjan Bhattacharya (writer) (1903–1939), Bengali children's writer
 Manoranjan Bhattacharya (revolutionary) (1910–1932), Indian independence activist and Bengali revolutionary

See also
 Monoranjan Bhattacharya, Indian footballer and manager